Robert John C. Robinson (9 November 1906 – 1990) was an English professional footballer. He played for Gillingham in the 1929–30 season.

References

1906 births
1990 deaths
English footballers
Gillingham F.C. players
Association footballers not categorized by position